Temte is a Norwegian surname. Notable people with the surname include:

Ole Kristian Temte (born 1975), Norwegian race car driver
Rune Temte (born 1965), Norwegian actor

Norwegian-language surnames